Jeet Ka Dum  (English: Power to Win) was a Hum TV's presented television game show in Pakistan. It was televised live from Karachi being hosted by actor Faisal Qureshi.

Guests on the show have included  Atiqa Odho,  Asad Shafiq,   Fawad Alam, and Naz Baloch.

This show brings activities and competitions for the families and their children.

See also 
 Bazm E Tariq Aziz
 Inaam Ghar
 Inaam Ghar Plus
 Jeeto Pakistan

References

External links 
 Jeet Ka Dum (game show) of Hum TV Network on YouTube

2015 Pakistani television series debuts
Hum TV original programming
Urdu-language television shows
Pakistani game shows